The post-presidency of Jimmy Carter began on January 20, 1981 following the end of Jimmy Carter's term as president. Carter was the 39th president of the United States, serving from 1977 to 1981. After leaving office, he remained engaged in political and social projects, establishing the Carter Center, building his presidential library, teaching at Emory University in Atlanta, and writing numerous books, ranging from political memoirs to poetry. He also contributed to the expansion of the nonprofit housing organization Habitat for Humanity.

After he left office, Carter returned to Georgia to his peanut farm, which he had placed into a blind trust during his presidency to avoid even the appearance of a conflict of interest. He found that the trustees had mismanaged the trust, leaving him more than one million dollars in debt. In 1982, he established the Carter Center to promote and expand human rights, which earned him a Nobel Peace Prize in 2002. He traveled extensively to conduct peace negotiations, monitor elections and further the eradication of infectious diseases. He and his wife Rosalynn are key figures in Habitat for Humanity. Carter wrote numerous books and continued to comment on global affairs, including two books on the Israeli–Palestinian conflict, in which he criticized Israel's treatment of Palestinians as apartheid. He and Rosalynn received the Presidential Medal of Freedom in 1999.

Aged 98, Carter is the oldest living, longest-lived and longest-married president, and has the longest post-presidency. He is the third-oldest living former state leader. On February 18, 2023, it was announced that Carter was in home hospice care. The statement, published by the Carter Center, read:After a series of short hospital stays, former U.S. President Jimmy Carter today decided to spend his remaining time at home with his family and receive hospice care instead of additional medical intervention. He has the full support of his family and his medical team. The Carter family asks for privacy during this time and is grateful for the concern shown by his many admirers.

Carter Center and Nobel Prize 

Carter has been involved in a variety of national and international public policy, conflict resolution, human rights and charitable causes. In 1982, he established the Carter Center in Atlanta to advance human rights and alleviate human suffering. The non-profit, nongovernmental Center promotes democracy, mediates and prevents conflicts, and monitors the electoral process in support of free and fair elections. It also works to improve global health through the control and eradication of diseases such as Guinea worm disease, river blindness, malaria, trachoma, lymphatic filariasis, and schistosomiasis. It also works to diminish the stigma of mental illnesses and improve nutrition through increased crop production in Africa.

A major accomplishment of The Carter Center has been the elimination of more than 99 percent of cases of Guinea worm disease, from an estimated 3.5 million cases in 1986 to 148 reported cases in 2013 to 23 in 2015 The Carter Center has monitored 96 elections in 38 countries since 1989. It has worked to resolve conflicts in Haiti, Bosnia, Ethiopia, North Korea, Sudan and other countries. Carter and the Center support human rights defenders around the world and have intervened with heads of state on their behalf.

In 2002, President Carter received the Nobel Peace Prize for his work "to find peaceful solutions to international conflicts, to advance democracy and human rights, and to promote economic and social development" through The Carter Center. Three sitting presidents, Theodore Roosevelt, Woodrow Wilson, and Barack Obama, have received the prize; Carter is unique in receiving the award for his actions after leaving the presidency. He is one of two Georgian laureates, along with Martin Luther King Jr.

Diplomacy

North Korea
In 1994, North Korea had expelled investigators from the International Atomic Energy Agency and was threatening to begin processing spent nuclear fuel. In response, then-President Bill Clinton pressured for US sanctions and ordered large numbers of troops and vehicles into the area to brace for war.

Clinton secretly recruited Carter to undertake a peace mission to North Korea, under the guise that it was a private mission of Carter's. Clinton saw Carter as a way to let North Korean President Kim Il-sung back down without losing face.

Carter negotiated an understanding with Kim Il-sung, but went further and outlined a treaty, which he announced on CNN without the permission of the Clinton White House as a way to force the US into action.

The Clinton Administration signed a later version of the Agreed Framework, under which North Korea agreed to freeze and ultimately dismantle its current nuclear program and comply with its nonproliferation obligations in exchange for oil deliveries, the construction of two light water reactors to replace its graphite reactors, and discussions for eventual diplomatic relations.

The agreement was widely hailed at the time as a significant diplomatic achievement. However, in December 2002, the Agreed Framework collapsed as a result of a dispute between the George W. Bush Administration and the North Korean government of Kim Jong-il.

In 2001, George W. Bush had taken a confrontational position toward North Korea. And in January 2002, Bush had named North Korea as part of an "Axis of Evil". Meanwhile, North Korea began developing the capability to enrich uranium. Bush Administration opponents of the Agreed Framework believed that the North Korean government never intended to give up a nuclear weapons program. However, supporters of the Agreed Framework believed that the agreement could have been successful, had it not been undermined by the Bush Administration.

On September 5, 2003, in Tokyo, Carter met with Prime Minister of Japan Junichiro Koizumi and said, in reference to North Korea's resuming of its nuclear program, "This paranoid nation and the United States now are facing what I believe to be the greatest threat in the world to regional and global peace."

In August 2010, Carter traveled to North Korea in an attempt to secure the release of Aijalon Mahli Gomes. Gomes, a U.S. citizen, was sentenced to eight years of hard labor after being found guilty of illegally entering North Korea. Carter successfully secured the release.

On August 10, 2017, amid threats of weaponry by both North Korean and American leadership toward each other, Carter assessed the rhetoric as having "probably eliminated any chance of good faith peace talks between the United States and North Korea."

In an October 2017 interview with Maureen Dowd, Carter stated his willingness to aid then-President Donald Trump with resolving growing tensions between the US and North Korea and confirmed he had notified National Security Advisor H. R. McMaster that he was open to serving as an American diplomatic envoy to North Korea.

In March 2018, after President Trump agreed to a meeting with North Korea leader Kim Jong-un, Carter expressed his endorsement of the decision and said it would be "a wonderful achievement" if the US could avoid a nuclear confrontation with North Korea.

Middle East
In September 1981, Carter met with Prime Minister of Israel Menachem Begin at his home for discussions during which Carter claimed Begin said his country was now willing to accept proposals on the Palestinian autonomy advanced by the Carter administration the previous year. On September 23, 1982, after the Sabra and Shatila massacre, Carter told reporters that the killings had shown the importance of the Camp David Accords in stabilizing peace and that Prime Minister Begin had "made a terrible mistake in not demanding a complete investigation of this massacre of innocent people." In March 1987, Carter conducted a private visit to Egypt, during which saying that Israel's failure to live up to the commitments made in the Camp David Accords contributed to the statelessness of the Palestinians.

During an August 9, 1981 ceremony honoring President of Egypt Anwar Sadat, Carter stated it was "time for all Palestinian leaders to forego the use of violence and to recognize Israel's right to exist in peace." He also said peace was still possible through Sadat but progress toward this endeavor had not been sustained in the aftermath of the Camp David Accords. In October, after Sadat's assassination, Carter attended the latter's funeral and stated his belief that Sadat's successor Hosni Mubarak was dedicated to carrying out the "peace process initiated by President Sadat".

In March 1983, Carter underwent a weeklong visit to Egypt where he met with Palestine Liberation Organization members, stating during a subsequent March 8 press conference that he had traveled there as an Emory University professor and not to represent the US. 

During a June 20, 2012 phone call with Jeffrey Brown, Carter stressed Egyptian military generals could be granted full power executively and legislatively in addition to being able to form a new constitution in favor of themselves in the event their announced intentions went through; Carter expressing distaste with the plan: "I hope it doesn’t go through and that the United States and others will speak out strongly enough to have influence on the military to control and to carry out the promises that they made to me and to the Egyptian people and to the international community." 

In May 2014, Carter issued a statement saying he was "gravely concerned that Egypt's democratic transition has faltered" and called for the next President of Egypt "to ensure the full spectrum of Egyptian society can participate meaningfully in politics". In October 2014, after the Carter Center closed its office in Egypt, Carter explained the decision as resulting from Egypt's current environment being "not conducive to genuine democratic elections and civic participation."

On March 27, 1990, Carter met with President George H. W. Bush, United States Secretary of State James Baker, and National Security Advisor Brent Scowcroft in the Oval Office for a discussion on Carter's latest trip to the Middle East. Carter told reporters, "I believe that a comprehensive peace is both necessary and, I think, is inevitable. When it will come, remains to be seen."

Carter and experts from The Carter Center assisted unofficial Israeli and Palestinian negotiators in designing a model agreement for peace—called the Geneva Accord—in 2002–2003.

Carter has also in recent years become a frequent critic of Israel's policies in Lebanon, the West Bank, and Gaza.

In 2006, at the UK Hay Festival, Carter stated that Israel had at least 150 nuclear weapons. He expressed his support for Israel as a country, but criticized its domestic and foreign policy;
"One of the greatest human rights crimes on earth is the starvation and imprisonment of 1.6m Palestinians," said Carter. In December of that year, during an interview, Carter said, "When Israel does occupy this territory deep within the West Bank, and connects the 200-or-so settlements with each other, with a road, and then prohibits the Palestinians from using that road, or in many cases even crossing the road, this perpetrates even worse instances of apartness, or apartheid, than we witnessed even in South Africa."

He mentioned statistics showing the nutritional intake of some Palestinian children was below that of the children of Sub-Saharan Africa and described the European position on Israel as "supine".

In April 2008, the London-based Arabic newspaper Al-Hayat reported that Carter met with exiled Hamas leader Khaled Mashaal on his visit to Syria. The Carter Center initially neither confirmed nor denied the story. The US State Department considers Hamas a terrorist organization. Within this Mid-East trip, Carter also laid a wreath on the grave of Yasser Arafat in Ramallah on April 14, 2008. Carter said on April 23 that neither Condoleezza Rice nor anyone else in the State Department had warned him against meeting with Hamas leaders during his trip. Carter spoke to Mashaal on several matters, including "formulas for prisoner exchange to obtain the release of Corporal Shalit."

In May 2007, while arguing that the United States should directly talk to Iran, Carter again stated that Israel had 150 nuclear weapons in its arsenal.

In December 2008, Carter visited Damascus again, where he met with Syrian President Bashar al-Assad, and the Hamas leadership. During his visit he gave an exclusive interview to Forward Magazine, the first ever interview for any American president, current or former, with a Syrian media outlet.

Carter visited three officials from Hamas who have been living at the International Red Cross office in Jerusalem since July 2010. Israel believes that these three Hamas legislators had a role in the 2006 kidnapping of Israeli soldier Gilad Shalit, and has a deportation order set for them.

In August 2014, Carter was joined by Mary Robinson during the 2014 Israel–Gaza conflict with the pair pressing for the inclusion of Hamas as an actor in peace talks with Israel, recognition of the group as a legitimate political entity, and the lifting of the siege of Gaza. The two Elders, in an op-ed article in Foreign Policy, noted the recent unity deal between Hamas and Fatah when Hamas agreed with the Palestinian Authority to denounce violence, recognize Israel and adhere to past agreements, saying it presented an opportunity. Carter and Robinson called on the UN Security Council to act on what they described as the inhumane conditions in Gaza, and mandate an end to the siege.

In July 2015, after Senator Bob Corker espoused that Iran had "fleeced" Secretary of State Kerry in negotiations over the Joint Comprehensive Plan of Action, Carter stated that he believed "Corker's comments were improper and a mistake" and that he was "wrong about the Iran nuclear deal, I think it's a very good one."

On May 9, 2018, after President Trump announced the US was withdrawing from the Joint Comprehensive Plan of Action, Carter said the decision was "may be the worst mistake Trump has made so far" and that presidents should abide by agreements signed by their predecessors unless "the situation changes dramatically". Carter furthered that the move may have a negative impact on relations between the US and North Korea, showing the latter country "that if the United States signs an agreement, it may or may not be honored."

Africa

Carter held summits in Egypt and Tunisia in 1995–1996 to address violence in the Great Lakes region of Africa.

Carter played a key role in negotiation of the Nairobi Agreement in 1999 between Sudan and Uganda.

On June 18, 2007, Carter, accompanied by his wife, arrived in Dublin, Ireland, for talks with President Mary McAleese and Bertie Ahern concerning human rights. On June 19, Carter attended and spoke at the annual Human Rights Forum at Croke Park. An agreement between Irish Aid and The Carter Center was also signed on this day..

Carter, as a former US President, was among past and present world leaders who attended the 2013 memorial service of Nelson Mandela in Johannesburg, South Africa.

Americas
In October 1984, Carter traveled to Machu Picchu, being named by Mayor of Cusco Daniel Estrada as an honorary citizen. During April 2001, Carter endorsed the presidential and legislative elections in Peru as "completely honest, fair and transparent." In April 2009, Carter met with President of Peru Alan Garcia at Government Palace in Lima. After the meeting Carter told the press, "We are happy and full of admiration for all the achievements of his (Garcia’s) Government."

In February 1986, Carter traveled to Nicaragua for a three-day tour, being welcomed by Vice President of Nicaragua Sergio Ramírez who said Carter's visit was furthering "the policy of peace" as opposed to "the policy of war" carried out by the Reagan administration. In his talks with Tomás Borge, Carter secured the release of journalist Luis Mora and labor leader Jose Altamirano, saying during his departure that it was still possible for the US to "regain the path we envisioned in 1979."

In May 1989, Carter and former President Ford traveled to Panama alongside a delegation for the monitoring of elections within the country to ensure they were, as Carter stated during a press conference, "free and fair".

Carter led a mission to Haiti in 1994 with Senator Sam Nunn and former chairman of the Joint Chiefs of Staff General Colin Powell to avert a US-led multinational invasion and restore to power Haiti's democratically elected president, Jean-Bertrand Aristide.

Carter visited Cuba in May 2002 and had full discussions with Fidel Castro and the Cuban government. He was allowed to address the Cuban public uncensored on national television and radio with a speech that he wrote and presented in Spanish. In the speech, he called on the US to end "an ineffective 43-year-old economic embargo" and on Castro to hold free elections, improve human rights, and allow greater civil liberties. He met with political dissidents; visited the AIDS sanitarium, a medical school, a biotech facility, an agricultural production cooperative, and a school for disabled children; and threw a pitch for an all-star baseball game in Havana. The visit made Carter the first President of the United States, in or out of office, to visit the island since the Cuban revolution of 1959. Carter toured Cuba again for three days in March 2011.

Carter observed the Venezuela recall elections on August 15, 2004. European Union observers had declined to participate, saying too many restrictions were put on them by the Hugo Chávez administration. A record number of voters turned out to defeat the recall attempt with a 59 percent "no" vote. The Carter Center stated that the process "suffered from numerous irregularities," but said it did not observe or receive "evidence of fraud that would have changed the outcome of the vote". 

On the afternoon of August 16, 2004, the day after the vote, Carter and Organization of American States (OAS) Secretary General César Gaviria gave a joint press conference in which they endorsed the preliminary results announced by the National Electoral Council. The monitors' findings "coincided with the partial returns announced today by the National Elections Council," said Carter, while Gaviria added that the OAS electoral observation mission's members had "found no element of fraud in the process." Directing his remarks at opposition figures who made claims of "widespread fraud" in the voting, Carter called on all Venezuelans to "accept the results and work together for the future". 

A Penn, Schoen & Berland Associates (PSB) exit poll had predicted that Chávez would lose by 20 percent; when the election results showed him to have won by 20 percent, Douglas Schoen commented, "I think it was a massive fraud". US News & World Report offered an analysis of the polls, indicating "very good reason to believe that the [Penn, Schoen & Berland] exit poll had the result right, and that Chávez's election officialsand Carter and the American mediagot it wrong." The exit poll and the Venezuela government's control of election machines became the basis of claims of election fraud. However an Associated Press report states that Penn, Schoen & Berland used volunteers from pro-recall organization Súmate for fieldwork, and its results contradicted five other opposition exit polls.

Following Ecuador's severing of ties with Colombia in March 2008, Carter brokered a deal for agreement between the countries' respective presidents on the restoration of low-level diplomatic relations announced June 8, 2008.

Southeast Asia
In June 1985, Carter visited Cambodian refugees while touring Khao-I-Dang, Carter stating his interest in eventually touring "the whole place."

On November 18, 2009, Carter visited Vietnam to build houses for the poor. The one-week program, known as Jimmy and Rosalynn Carter Work Project 2009, built 32 houses in Dong Xa village, in the northern province of Hải Dương. The project launch was scheduled for November 14, according to the news source which quoted the Ministry of Foreign Affairs spokeswoman Nguyen Phuong Nga.

Administered by the non-governmental and non-profit Habitat for Humanity International (HFHI), the annual program of 2009 would build and repair 166 homes in Vietnam and some other Asian countries with the support of nearly 3,000 volunteers around the world, the organization said on its website. HFHI has worked in Vietnam since 2001 to provide low-cost housing, water, and sanitation solutions for the poor. It has worked in provinces like Tiền Giang and Đồng Nai as well as Ho Chi Minh City.

The Elders

On July 18, 2007, Carter joined Nelson Mandela in Johannesburg, South Africa, to announce his participation in The Elders, a group of independent global leaders who work together on peace and human rights issues. The Elders work globally, on thematic as well as geographically specific subjects. The organization's priority issue areas include the Israeli–Palestinian conflict, the Korean Peninsula, Sudan, and South Sudan, sustainable development, and equality for girls and women.

Carter has been actively involved in the work of The Elders, participating in visits to Cyprus, the Korean Peninsula, and the Middle East, among others In October 2007, Carter toured Darfur with several of the Elders, including Desmond Tutu. Sudanese security prevented him from visiting a Darfuri tribal leader, leading to a heated exchange. He returned to Sudan with fellow Elder Lakhdar Brahimi in May 2012 as part of The Elders' efforts to encourage the presidents of Sudan and South Sudan to return to negotiations, and highlight the impact of the conflict on civilians.

In November 2008, President Carter, former UN Secretary General Kofi Annan, and Graça Machel, wife of Nelson Mandela, were stopped from entering Zimbabwe, to inspect the human rights situation, by President Robert Mugabe's government. The Elders instead made their assessment from South Africa, meeting with Zimbabwe- and South Africa-based leaders from politics, business, international organisations and civil society in Johannesburg.

Criticism of U.S. policy

In 2001, Carter criticized President Bill Clinton's controversial pardon of Marc Rich, calling it "disgraceful" and suggesting that Rich's financial contributions to the Democratic Party were a factor in Clinton's action.

In June 2005, Carter urged the closing of the Guantanamo Bay Prison in Cuba, which has been a focal point for recent claims of prisoner abuse.

In September 2006, Carter was interviewed on the BBC's current affairs program Newsnight, voicing his concern at the increasing influence of the Religious Right on US politics.

In September 2009, Carter put weight behind allegations by Venezuelan President Hugo Chávez, pertaining to United States involvement in the 2002 Venezuelan coup d'état attempt by a civilian-military junta, saying that Washington knew about the coup and may have taken part.

On June 16, 2011, the 40th anniversary of Richard Nixon's official declaration of America's War on Drugs, Carter wrote an op-ed in The New York Times urging the United States and the rest of the world to "Call Off the Global War on Drugs", explicitly endorsing the initiative released by the Global Commission on Drug Policy earlier that month and quoting a message he gave to Congress in 1977 saying that "[p]enalties against possession of a drug should not be more damaging to an individual than the use of the drug itself."

Criticisms of Ronald Reagan
In March 1981, Carter cited his choice to refrain from critiquing Reagan was due to not enough time having passed within his tenure and predicted the "next few months" would see programs from his administration be viewed more favorably by the public. On March 31, after the attempted assassination, Carter said danger was a consistent part of being president and President Reagan's public appearances would not be curtailed. On May 8, while delivering a speech in Independence, Missouri, Carter critiqued "those who argue that the main business of government is to do nothing", the comment being seen as a reference to the Reagan administration.

In a September 3 press conference, Carter confirmed that he was in agreement with Reagan on building neutron arms in the wake of the Soviet invasion of Afghanistan but said he hoped that when the Soviet Union "is willing to implement the termination of aggression and move towards peace and the control of nuclear weapons our country will be ready to cooperate with them completely as we have been in the past." In October, Carter traveled to Washington for the lobbying of senators in support of providing Saudi Arabia with Awacs radar surveillance aircraft and said he believed the Reagan administration was not doing enough in the Middle East.

During a May 1, 1982 fundraising dinner, Carter called on Democrats and Republicans to work together in solving America economic issues instead of the Democrats condemning the Reagan administration's budget for the fiscal year of 1983. On August 24, in a speech endorsing Charlie Rose in Fayetteville, North Carolina, Carter critiqued the Reagan administration for instituting radicalism in economic and social policies and administering "the highest tax cuts in history, primarily for the wealthy Americans, followed by the highest tax increase."
On September 20, Carter stated more American involvement might have prevented the deaths in the Sabra and Shatila massacre and charged the Reagan administration with "belatedly ... playing its role as a strong mediator in bringing the parties together." 

On September 30, amid a fundraising dinner, Carter responded to criticism made by President Reagan during a news conference two days prior on his administration's handling of the economy by saying his administration "did not spend four years blaming our mistakes on our predecessors". On October 9, Carter expressed his distaste for his administration being blamed by President Reagan: "'When I became president, the responsibilities were mine. They were not Gerald Ford's, Richard Nixon's, they were not John Kennedy's, Dwight Eisenhower's or Harry Truman's -- they were mine." 

On October 26, Carter called on the Reagan administration to support the Camp David agreement during a news conference: "'Although it was tardy by about 18 months, I was very pleased by the speech President Reagan made recently about his intentions for a Middle East peace." While speaking at a news conference on November 10, Carter outlined his distaste with President Reagan shifting US foreign and domestic policy and said, "'There is always the temptation for an incumbent politician to blame all his mistakes on his predecessor. Most are willing to withstand the temptation. Mr. Reagan, apparently, is not."

In a January 1983 interview, Carter stated his belief that the Reagan campaign had convinced voters of an administration that would provide "simple answers to very complicated questions and simple and easy, magic solutions to intransigent problems."
During a June 1983 appearance at the Amnesty International conference on human rights at Emory University, Carter rebuked the Reagan administration for lacking an address on human rights violations. "The silence coming out of Washington these days, concerning these gross human rights violations, is very disturbing."

On October 9, 1984, while addressing a university group, Carter assessed Reagan with having characterized human rights as a sign of weakness during presidential debates four years prior and stated his disagreement with the view. "He's a Republican. I'm a Democrat. I can't swear that my policy is correct -- I think it is. I think in some ways our human rights policy was effective."
In December 1984, during a press conference, Carter asserted that the Reagan administration was inactive in making rescue efforts to retrieve four American businessmen from West Beirut: "Our government is not making any effort to seek the return of the hostages. It is not a very publicized fact."

In a March 1985 interview with 60 Minutes, Carter said President Reagan was at fault for a lack of progression in peace within the Middle East and charged Reagan with being "extremely successful in not being responsible for anything that's unpleasant". On April 11, Carter said that by supporting the Strategic Defense Initiative, the Reagan administration was "increasing misunderstanding between us and our allies" and giving the Kremlin an advantage in public relations. In July of that year, Carter expressed his disagreements with Reagan's claim of "an international conspiracy" on the issue of terrorism and with "some of the particular countries" Reagan asserted as supporting terrorism to the American Bar Association.

In a March 1986 interview with the New York Times, Carter stated that President Reagan was persisting in making claims "he knows are not true and personally promised me not to repeat." On December 8, during an appearance at a fundraiser, Carter stated that President Reagan had damaged the presidency by not publicly stating the truth in regards to the Iran-Contra Affair and predicted "the various committees are going to conduct their investigations, and it's all going to come out, which will be much more damaging to the institution of the Presidency than if the President had come out in the beginning."

In February 1987, while speaking to students, Carter differentiated his administration from Reagan's by saying his own did not adhere to demands from terrorists and it was a lesson the Reagan administration could learn. In March 1987, Carter traveled to Damascus, Syria, where he expressed his belief that the Reagan administration had not retained peace efforts in the Middle East. In September 1987, Carter announced his opposition to Supreme Court nominee Robert Bork over the latter's views on civil rights and associations in a letter to Senate Judiciary Committee Chairman Joe Biden. During a September 14 interview, Carter said the Iran-Contra Affair was of more seriousness than Watergate and the conflict has encouraged terrorists. 

In October 1987, Carter urged President Reagan to invoke the War Powers Resolution, arguing this would "help alleviate the worldwide belief" of Congress disapproving of the Persian Gulf's naval buildup. During an October 16 news conference, Carter said Reagan's policy in the Persian Gulf had been responsible for large increases in violence: "Almost inevitably and down through history, whenever a nation like ours injects itself into the military conflict or a civil war like in Lebanon or sectional war like between Iran and Iraq, we almost inevitably are destined to become involved as a belligerent."

On January 18, 1989, shortly before the inauguration of George H. W. Bush, Carter and Ford spoke informally at a symposium focused on presidential dealings with the press and participated in news conference at Columbia University, the two agreeing that President Reagan had enjoyed a press honeymoon that was not guaranteed to translate to his immediate successor when the latter took office, Carter adding that Reagan had gotten away with having few press conferences than his predecessors. Carter also stated his favoring of the policy by USA Today that barred unidentified sources being quoted in articles and advocated all media copy this pattern.

Criticism of the Clintons

Carter and Bill Clinton did not have a good relationship, as Clinton had blamed one of President Carter's policies for losing the governorship of Arkansas in 1980. Although Clinton was the first Democratic president to be elected after Carter, the Carters were snubbed at the first Clinton inauguration. Carter had publicly criticized the morality of President Clinton's administration including the Monica Lewinsky scandal and the Marc Rich pardon. Carter was also disenchanted with Clinton's post-presidency activities, including the latter's $350,000 speeches and "glitz of his star and billionaire studded annual Clinton Global Initiative (CGI) meetings in New York". While Clinton was seen as a "rock star" who made "his trips to Africa on board the lavish private jets of his billionaire buddies" and had an "sleek, expensive library...for being mostly about self-aggrandizement", Carter remained humble as he flew commercial airlines and founded the Carter Center to incubate good ideas.

Due to his status as former president, Carter was a superdelegate to the 2008 Democratic National Convention. Carter announced his endorsement of Senator Barack Obama over Senator Hillary Clinton. Carter cautioned against Hillary Clinton being picked for the vice president slot on the ticket, saying "I think it would be the worst mistake that could be made. That would just accumulate the negative aspects of both candidates", citing opinion polls showing 50% of US voters with a negative view of Hillary Clinton. During a phone interview a year after Hillary Clinton's tenure of secretary of state in the Obama administration ended and she was succeeded by John Kerry, Carter said, "In this occasion, when Secretary Clinton was Secretary of State, she took very little action to bring about peace. It was only John Kerry’s coming into office that reinitiated all these very important and crucial issues."

Criticisms of George W. Bush and Tony Blair

Carter has criticized the presidency of George W. Bush and the Iraq War. In a 2003 op-ed in The New York Times, Carter warned against the consequences of a war in Iraq and urged restraint in use of military force. In March 2004, Carter condemned George W. Bush and UK Prime Minister Tony Blair for waging an unnecessary war "based upon lies and misinterpretations" to oust Saddam Hussein. In August 2006, Carter criticized Blair for being "subservient" to the Bush administration and accused Blair of giving unquestioning support to Bush's Iraq policies. 

In a May 2007 interview with the Arkansas Democrat-Gazette, he said, "I think as far as the adverse impact on the nation around the world, this administration has been the worst in history," when it comes to foreign affairs. Two days after the quote was published, Carter told NBC's Today that the "worst in history" comment was "careless or misinterpreted," and that he "wasn't comparing this administration with other administrations back through history, but just with President Nixon's." The day after the "worst in history" comment was published, White House spokesman Tony Fratto said that Carter had become "increasingly irrelevant with these kinds of comments."

On May 19, 2007, Blair made his final visit to Iraq before stepping down as prime minister, and Carter criticized him afterward. Carter told the BBC that Blair was "apparently subservient" to Bush and criticized him for his "blind support" for the Iraq war. Carter described Blair's actions as "abominable" and stated that the British Prime Minister's "almost undeviating support for the ill-advised policies of President Bush in Iraq have been a major tragedy for the world." Carter said he believes that had Blair distanced himself from the Bush administration during the run-up to the invasion of Iraq in 2003, it might have made a crucial difference to American political and public opinion, and consequently the invasion might not have gone ahead. Carter states that "one of the defenses of the Bush administration ... has been, okay, we must be more correct in our actions than the world thinks because Great Britain is backing us. So I think the combination of Bush and Blair giving their support to this tragedy in Iraq has strengthened the effort and has made the opposition less effective, and prolonged the war and increased the tragedy that has resulted." Carter expressed his hope that Blair's successor, Gordon Brown, would be "less enthusiastic" about Bush's Iraq policy.

Speaking to the Syrian English monthly Forward Magazine of Syria, Carter was asked to give one word that came to mind when mentioning President George W. Bush. His answer was: the end of a very disappointing administration. His reaction to mentioning Barack Obama was: honesty, intelligence, and politically adept.

Comments on Barack Obama 

On January 28, 2009, a week after the first inauguration of Barack Obama, Carter said he believed Obama would be "an outstanding president" during an interview with Charlie Rose. In September, Carter told Brian Williams that he believed "an overwhelming portion of the intensely demonstrated animosity toward President Barack Obama is based on the fact that he is a black man" and that inclinations of racism had "bubbled up to the surface because of the belief of many white people, not just in the South but around the country, that African-Americans are not qualified to lead this great country. It's an abominable circumstance, and it grieves me and concerns me very deeply." In response, White House Press Secretary Robert Gibbs espoused that Obama "does not think it is based on the color of his skin." Republican National Committee chairman Michael Steele called Carter's comments "flat out wrong. This isn’t about race. It is about policy."

In November 2010, Carter was supposed to meet with National Security Advisor Thomas E. Donilon when Obama requested Carter stop by for a visit. In a CBS interview, Carter stated that Obama "will be much more independent in fighting hard to prevail and not trying to reach out" in the next two years and that Republicans would "be responsible for a major element of the U.S. government" following their victory in the 2010 elections.

Carter has criticized the Obama administration for its use of drone strikes against suspected terrorists.
Carter also said that he disagrees with President Obama's decision to keep the Guantánamo Bay detention camp open, saying that the inmates "have been tortured by waterboarding more than 100 times or intimidated with semiautomatic weapons, power drills or threats to sexually assault their mothers." He claimed that the U.S. government had no moral leadership, and was committing human rights violations, and is no longer "the global champion of human rights".

In July 2013, Carter expressed his criticism of current federal surveillance programs as disclosed by Edward Snowden indicating that "America has no functioning democracy at this moment."

Comments on Donald Trump

On September 13, 2017, Carter said the publicity President Trump had brought to the Deferred Action for Childhood Arrivals program by giving Congress a six-month deadline to address the issue could result in comprehensive immigration reform not undertaken by both the Bush and Obama administrations while speaking to Emory University students. In an October 2017 interview, Carter stated he believed President Trump was exacerbating racial divisions within the US due to his response to the U.S. national anthem protests, though possibly unknowingly, whilst stating he would rather see the players stand during the anthem.

On March 25, 2018, Carter stated his opposition to President Trump being impeached, believing that the oversight of both Congress and the Supreme Court was enough to keep him in check. Carter also expressed his belief that Trump wanted "to do a good job" and his willingness to assist him.

In June 2019, during a panel hosted by the Carter Center, Carter said that he believed "a full investigation would show that Trump didn’t actually win the election in 2016. He lost the election, and he was put into office because the Russians interfered on his behalf." Carter also called for Trump to condemn Russia for their meddling and acknowledge their interference.
In October, as the Trump administration faced allegations that the president had abused his power to compel Ukraine to investigate Joe Biden, Carter told MSNBC that Trump was "stonewalling" by blocking witnesses and documents and warned that if facts "reveal an increasing number of things that he has actually done, then of course impeachment is possible and removal from office is possible."

In April 2020, after Trump announced the halting of funding of the World Health Organization to review its warnings about COVID-19 and China, Carter said he was "distressed" by this choice and called the WHO "the only international organization capable of leading the effort to control this virus."

Comments on Joe Biden
Jimmy and Rosalynn Carter did not attend the inauguration of Joe Biden, which occurred during the height of the COVID-19 pandemic. However, President Biden said that he spoke to President Carter shortly before his inauguration. Carter had previously praised Biden at the 2020 Democratic National Convention.

On April 29, 2021, President Biden and First Lady Jill Biden visited the Carters at their home in Plains, Georgia.

Author

Carter has been a prolific author in his post-presidency, writing 21 of his 23 books. Among these is one he co-wrote with his wife, Rosalynn, and a children's book illustrated by his daughter, Amy. They cover a variety of topics, including humanitarian work, aging, religion, human rights, and poetry.

Palestine: Peace Not Apartheid

In a 2007 speech to Brandeis University, Carter stated: "I have spent a great deal of my adult life trying to bring peace to Israel and its neighbors, based on justice and righteousness for the Palestinians. These are the underlying purposes of my new book."

In his book Palestine: Peace Not Apartheid, published in November 2006, Carter states:

He declares that Israel's current policies in the Palestinian territories constitute "a system of apartheid, with two peoples occupying the same land, but completely separated from each other, with Israelis totally dominant and suppressing violence by depriving Palestinians of their basic human rights." In an Op-Ed titled "Speaking Frankly about Israel and Palestine," published in the Los Angeles Times and other newspapers, Carter states:

While somesuch as a former Special Rapporteur for both the United Nations Commission on Human Rights and the International Law Commission, as well as a member of the Israeli Knessethave praised Carter for speaking frankly about Palestinians in Israeli occupied lands, othersincluding the envoy to the Middle East under Clinton, as well as the first director of the Carter Centerhave accused him of anti-Israeli bias. Specifically, these critics have alleged significant factual errors, omissions and misstatements in the book.

The 2007 documentary film, Man from Plains, follows President Carter during his tour for the controversial book and other humanitarian efforts.

In December 2009, Carter apologized for any words or deeds that may have upset the Jewish community in an open letter meant to improve an often tense relationship. He said he was offering an Al Het, a prayer said on Yom Kippur, the Jewish Day of Atonement.

Involvement with Bank of Credit and Commerce International
After Carter left the presidency, his interest in the developing countries led him to having a close relationship with Agha Hasan Abedi, the founder of Bank of Credit and Commerce International (BCCI). Abedi was a Pakistani, whose bank had offices and business in a large number of developing countries. He was introduced to Carter in 1982 by Bert Lance, one of Carter's closest friends. (Unknown to Carter, BCCI had secretly purchased an interest in 1978 in National Bank of Georgia, which had previously been run by Lance and had made loans to Carter's peanut business.) Abedi made generous donations to the Carter Center and the Global 2000 Project. 

Abedi traveled with Carter to at least seven countries in connection with Carter's charitable activities. Jimmy Carter often advocated that BCCI was unique of all the banks that he had seen. However, it is argued that the main purpose of Abedi's association with Carter was not charitable activities, but to enhance BCCI's influence, in order to open more offices and develop more business. In 1991, BCCI was seized by regulators, amid allegations of criminal activities, including illegally having control of several U.S. banks.

Presidential politics

1984 Presidential race
The possibility of Carter running for a non-consecutive second term in 1984 was raised by commentators, and favored by his wife Rosalynn. Walter Mondale, Carter's former Vice President who was mulling a presidential bid of his own, met with Carter ahead of the election year to confront him on whether he intended to run. On May 10, 1982, Carter stated he would support Mondale in the latter's presidential bid during a press conference. In June, Carter made an appearance at a dinner to raise funds for Democrats, offering praise of Mondale, who was also in attendance: "'A lot of people say Fritz has been going around the country and he hasn't mentioned me very often, but Fritz, tonight you outdid yourself and we're partners again."

On January 27, 1983, in interviews with the Houston Post and the Houston Chronicle, Carter stated his belief that President Reagan would lose his re-election bid due to Americans having been promised various solutions that Reagan was unable to keep and said he had disagreements with the administration "in human rights, arms control, environmental policies and the search for peace." On July 18, Carter said he believed President Reagan would still seek re-election despite a controversy over his campaign having had access to White House documents while in Japan. On August 30, Carter met with Mondale, telling reporters ahead of the meeting that Mondale had successfully distanced himself from the Carter administration to prevent the affiliation from being used against him.

During the 1984 Democratic presidential primary, Carter officially endorsed Mondale. In a June 13, 1984 interview, Carter said he believed Reagan would back out of debating Mondale during the general election. On June 26, Carter announced that he would attend the 1984 Democratic National Convention and possibly speak but would hinder his remarks from taking Mondale, by then the presumptive Democratic Party presidential nominee, out of the spotlight. Carter also advocated Mondale hasten the process of selecting a running mate. On November 7, after the election had taken place, Carter stated Mondale's loss had been predictable due to the latter stating his intent to raise taxes and that he did not believe any Democrat could win against Reagan's re-election bid while speaking at a news conference.

1988 Presidential race
On March 19, 1987, Carter stated Vice President George H. W. Bush was the likely Republican nominee and ruled out that he would be a candidate himself during an appearance at the Egypt chapter of the American Chamber of Commerce. On October 4, Carter stated Senator Paul Simon would be benefited by discussing his character and integrity and that following Reagan's tenure Americans would seek a candidate "who will tell them the truth and be competent and compassionate."

On July 16, 1988, Carter predicted Jesse Jackson would play a role in the decision making at the 1988 Democratic National Convention in a show of unity while touring the Omni Coliseum. Carter addressed the Democratic National Convention. On November 10, 1988, after Bush defeated Democratic nominee Michael Dukakis, Carter said the Republicans performed better than Democrats in marketing their candidates but stated President-elect Bush would have a more difficult time with lacking the popularity that President Reagan had.

1992 Presidential race
On February 22, 1992, Carter met with Massachusetts Senator Paul Tsongas in Plains, Georgia, Carter advising Tsongas to have his allies in Massachusetts campaign for him with in-person appearances and thereby repeat the efforts of Carter's own supporters during his successful bid. Carter also stated that he would not make an endorsement ahead of the March 3 primary. On April 13, during a meeting in Tokyo, Japan, Carter told Prime Minister of Japan Kiichi Miyazawa that Governor of Arkansas Bill Clinton would be "very friendly toward Japan, and he will be a good president for the U.S.-Japan relationship." 

On May 20, Carter met with Clinton and afterward publicly praised him, labeling third party candidate Ross Perot  "right now as kind of, anybody-but-the-above". In August, Carter was joined by Democratic presidential nominee Clinton, vice presidential nominee Al Gore, and their wives Tipper Gore and Hillary Clinton in constructing a home for Habitat for Humanity in East Atlanta. Carter stated that he hoped the 1992 Republican National Convention had some discussion on the subject of assisting the poor before it concluded the following day and that he was not bothered by attacks against his presidency at the Democratic National Convention. During the month, Carter and Clinton spent a day campaigning together in Atlanta. After the election, Carter said he expected to be consulted by President-elect Clinton during his tenure and that he had advised him to form a bipartisan study group to address "most controversial issues".

1996 Presidential race
In 1996, Carter did not attend the Democratic National Convention. The media of the time speculated that this was because of the rough relationship between him and Bill Clinton, the incumbent president, and Democratic nominee.

2000 Presidential race
Carter supported Al Gore in this race. In the turmoil following the presidential election, Carter stated his opinion that there should be a full recount by hand of all the votes in Florida. He suggested that a commission could propose this to both candidates, Gore and George W. Bush, and he stated that he would be willing to serve on such a commission.

2004 Presidential race
Carter supported John Kerry and during an interview said of him, "I look on Kerry as one who has gotten through his lifetime of experience exactly what is needed in makeup and battleground and learning and determination, and his ideals to be the president we need now in this troubled time." Carter spoke at the 2004 Democratic National Convention.

2008 Presidential race
In January 2008, during an interview with The Wall Street Journal, Carter praised Senator Barack Obama and the latter's presidential campaign, saying the Carter family and himself had been positively impacted by his candidacy and predicting Obama "will be almost automatically a healing factor in the animosity now that exists, that relates to our country and its government." In April, while in Abuja, Carter noted the support among Obama from those closest to him: "Don’t forget that Obama won in my state of Georgia. My town, which is home to 625 people, is for Obama, my children and their spouses are pro-Obama. My grandchildren are also pro-Obama." On May 25, Carter assessed that Senator Hillary Clinton would "give it up" after superdelegates voted following the conclusion of the June 3 primary.

In an August 2008 interview, Carter accused Republican presidential nominee John McCain of "milking every possible drop of advantage" in mentioning his status as a prisoner of war during the Vietnam War. McCain responded to Carter's comments during an appearance on Fox News: "I have great respect for former president Carter, but it's not first time we have disagreed. I don't think most Americans share that view. In fact, most of my supporters say talk more about your experiences, they were formative experiences."

2012 Presidential race
Despite being a Democrat, Carter made the unusual decision to endorse former Massachusetts governor Mitt Romney in the Republican party 2012 Presidential primary in mid-September 2011, not because he supported Romney, but because he felt Obama's re-election bid would be strengthened in a race against Romney. Carter added that he thought Mitt Romney would lose in a match up against Obama and that he supported the president's re-election. 

In an April 2012 interview, Carter admitted that he would rather have a Democrat in the White House, but that he would be comfortable with a Romney presidency because he thought "Romney has shown in the past – in his previous years as a moderate or progressive – that he was fairly competent as a governor and also running the Olympics." 

Romney repeatedly mentioned Carter on the campaign trail, hoping to invoke comparisons between the latter and Obama. In a series of appearances in May 2012, Romney said that "even Jimmy Carter would have given that order" when asked if he would have green-lighted the mission to kill Osama bin Laden and called Carter's presidency better for businesspeople than the Obama years have been.

Carter addressed the Democratic National Convention in North Carolina by videotape, and did not attend the convention in person.

2016 Presidential race
On July 8, 2015, Carter said the statements made by Republican candidate Donald Trump on Mexican illegal immigrants were "very stupid" and "ill-advised". He predicted that while Trump would secure a small percentage of supporters in the primary, the latter was "a flash in the pan." In a November 1, 2015 interview, Carter noted the contrasts between his own experiences seeking the presidency and the current political climate: "I think it is different now in the nation. And I think it’s being caused by the fact that when people do get to Washington, quite often there’s a stalemate there and both parties kind of relish the fact that they don’t get along with the other side. It’s a different environment."

During a February 3, 2016 appearance at the House of Lords in London, Britain, Carter was asked whom he would support for the presidency between Trump and Ted Cruz, his main primary rival, Carter selecting Trump and explaining that he had "proven already that he's completely malleable. I don't think he has any fixed opinions that he would really go to the White House and fight for." During a May 23 interview, Carter said the Trump campaign had "tapped a waiting reservoir there of inherent racism." During his video message at the 2016 Democratic National Convention in July, Carter characterized Trump as seeming "to reject the most important moral and ethical principles on which our nation was founded."

In 2017, Carter disclosed that, in the 2016 Democratic primary for President, he had voted for Senator Bernie Sanders.  In the general election, he voted for Hillary Clinton. During an interview, Carter stated he did not believe there had been Russian interference in determining the election results.

2020 Presidential race
In 2019 when asked about seeking non-consecutive second term and run in 2020, Carter commented that there should be an age limit for president, saying that he doesn't believe he could've handled the presidency at age 80. This was considered to discredit the 2020 Democratic frontrunners, who were ages 78 (Bernie Sanders), 70 (Elizabeth Warren), and 76 (Joe Biden, the eventual nominee). Carter was a late addition to speak at the 2020 Democratic National Convention, and endorsed Joe Biden in an audio message.

Hurricane relief
In September 2005, Carter criticized the response by the Federal Emergency Management Agency to Hurricane Katrina as "disgraceful" and said the US should focus on rebuilding New Orleans during an annual session at the Atlanta-based Carter Center.

Following Hurricane Sandy, Carter rebuilt homes in Union Beach as part of his affiliation with the Northeast Monmouth Habitat For Humanity, an area affected by the hurricane.

In September 2017, in response to Hurricane Harvey, Carter wrote an op-ed for CNN in which he stated the virtuous side of Americans is demonstrated in the aftermath of disasters, and partnered with former Presidents George H. W. Bush, Bill Clinton, George W. Bush, and Barack Obama to work with One America Appeal to help the victims of Hurricane Harvey and Hurricane Irma in the Gulf Coast and Texas communities.

Other activities

Relations and work with Gerald Ford
Carter ended up forming a close friendship with Gerald Ford after they had both left office, with the catalyst being their trip together to the funeral of Anwar el-Sadat in 1981. Until Ford's death, Carter and his wife, Rosalynn, visited the Fords' home frequently. Ford and Carter served as honorary co-chairs of the National Commission on Federal Election Reform in 2001 and of the Continuity of Government Commission in 2002.  For the latter commission, Carter served from 2003 to 2011 (he was co-chair with Ford until the latter's death). The Commission recommended improvements to continuity of government measures for the federal government.

Other
Carter has participated in many ceremonial events such as the opening of his own presidential library and those of Presidents Ronald Reagan, George H. W. Bush, Bill Clinton, and George W. Bush. He has also participated in many forums, lectures, panels, funerals and other events, such as the funeral of George H. W. Bush. In 2006 Carter delivered a eulogy at the funeral of Coretta Scott King  and, most recently, at the funeral of his former political rival, but later his close, personal friend and diplomatic collaborator, Gerald Ford. 

On August 28, 2013, Carter attended the Lincoln Memorial "Let Freedom Ring" ceremony commemorating the 50th anniversary of the March on Washington. Carter's address was in tribute to both Martin Luther King, Jr., who he said increased the likelihood of President Obama, Clinton, and himself being able to serve as presidents through his actions, and the King family, stating that he was grateful for their support of his presidential campaign.

In January 1984, a letter signed by Carter and Ford and urging world leaders to extend their failed effort to end world hunger was released and sent to Secretary-General of the United Nations Javier Pérez de Cuéllar.

President Jimmy Carter serves as an Honorary Chair for the World Justice Project. The World Justice Project works to lead a global, multidisciplinary effort to strengthen the Rule of Law for the development of communities of opportunity and equity.

References

Jimmy Carter
1981 beginnings
1980s in American politics
1990s in American politics
2000s in American politics
2010s in American politics
2020s in American politics
Carter, Jimmy